The 2022–23 Tunisian Ligue Professionnelle 1 (Tunisian Professional League) season is the 97th season of top-tier football in Tunisia.

Espérance de Tunis are the defending champions from the previous season.

Exceptionally, no match was played between 15 November and 10 December due to the 2022 FIFA World Cup, which was held in the same period in Qatar.

Teams
A total of 16 teams are contesting the league.

Stadiums and locations

The case of CS Chebba
On 18 April 2022, the match of the last round of the first round of the 2021–22 edition was held between Club Africain and CS Chebba at Hammadi Agrebi Stadium, Tunis and ended with a 1–0 win for the hosts, a result that made Hilal CS Chebba relegated to the Ligue 2. But CS Chebba protested the presence of Club Africain president, Youssef Elmi, on the bench despite his suspension from punishment by the Football Federation, and demanded that they would be given a penal victory, and they decided to take the case to CAS.

On 29 September, the CAS decided to reintegrate CS Chebba in the Ligue 1, which forced the federation to add a 16th team so that the number of teams would be even, and the identity of this team was determined by two playoff matches, the first between CS Hammam-Lif and ES Zarzis, and the second between the winner of the first match and ES Métlaoui.

Competition

First round

Group A

Table

Results

Clubs season-progress

Group B

Table

Results

Clubs season-progress

Goals scored per round
This graph represented the number of goals scored during each round:

Playoff

Table

Results

Clubs season-progress

Positions by round

Goals scored per round

This graph represents the number of goals scored during each round:

Playout

Table

Results

Clubs season-progress

Season statistics

Top scorers

Final ranking

Number of teams by Governorate

Awards
Internet users vote each month for the player of the month sponsored by Foot24 and Coca-Cola.

Media coverage

See also
2022–23 Tunisian Cup

Notes

References

External links
Fédération Tunisienne de Football

Tunisian Ligue Professionnelle 1 seasons
Tunisia
1